The Soviet Union national bandy team represented the Soviet Union in bandy. It was controlled by the Federation of bandy and field hockey USSR. 
Even if bandy was a popular sport domestically in the 1920s and 1930s, the Soviet Union did not compete in any internationals back then. Agreements were made to play friendlies against Sweden in the late 1940s, but the plans did not come to realization. However, after having seen Finland, Norway and Sweden playing bandy at the Winter Olympics in Oslo in 1952, the Soviet Union invited these three countries to a four nation bandy tournament in 1954. This was the first time a Soviet national bandy team met other national bandy teams. The four countries used somewhat different rules prior to this tournament, but the rules were adjusted to be the same for the future.

The Soviet team dominated the Bandy World Championships from its start in 1957 until the Soviet Union was dissolved in 1991, winning the first eleven championships (biennial tournaments from 1961) and winning all but three championships that they competed in. Its place in the championship was then taken over by Russia.

The Soviet Union also won the Rossiya Tournament eight times in ten appearances. In 1992 this tournament had changed names to Russian Government Cup and replacing the Soviet national bandy team, a bandy team representing the Commonwealth of Independent States made a one-time appearance there, also playing against the new Russia national bandy team.

References

National bandy teams
Bandy
Bandy in the Soviet Union
Bandy World Championship-winning countries